Adrian Tobias Gantenbein (born 18 April 2001) is a Swiss professional footballer who plays as a right-back for Winterthur.

Career
Gantenbein is a youth product of Winterthur since 2009, and began his senior career with the club in the Swiss Challenge League in 2020. He helped Winterthur win the 2021–22 Swiss Challenge League and earn promotion into the Swiss Super League. He made his professional debut with Winterthur in a 4–1 Swiss Super League loss to FC Lugano on 31 July 2022.

International career
Gantenbein is a youth international for Switzerland, having represented the Switzerland U21s in 2021.

Honours
Winterthur
 Swiss Challenge League: 2021–22

References

External links
 
 Football.ch Profile

2001 births
Living people
Swiss men's footballers
Switzerland under-21 international footballers
Association football fullbacks
FC Winterthur players
Swiss Super League players
Swiss Challenge League players